Goleba pallens is a species of jumping spider in the genus Goleba. The species has been identified in Angola, Congo, Ghana, Kenya and South Africa. The female was first described by John Blackwall in 1877. Initially placed in the genus Lyssomanes, the genus was moved to Asamonea by Eugène Simon in 1885 and was then to Goleba in 1980 by Fred Wanless.

References

Salticidae
Spiders described in 1877
Spiders of Africa
Taxa named by John Blackwall